Keen's myotis (Myotis keenii) is a species of vesper bat. It is found in British Columbia in Canada and in Washington and Alaska in the United States. It is named after the Rev. John Henry Keen, who collected the specimen that formed the basis for the first scientific description of the species. Classification for Keen's myotis formerly included the northern long-eared myotis (Myotis septentrionalis), resulting in older studies confusing the species for one another.

Description 
Measurements: Forearm 1.4-1.6 in., WT . Average body length 8–9 cm, tail length 4–5 cm.  In appearance, Keen's myotis is very similar to other long-eared bats of the same range, with characteristic dark brown patches on the shoulders.

Behavior 
Keen's myotis prefers coastal habitats, but is often found in urban areas as well. It frequently roosts in trees and rock crevices.  It is nocturnal and insectivorous. Keen's myotis probably exhibits the same breeding habits of other temperate vespertilionids, but there is little data available.

Lifespan 
In the wild, Keen's myotis is recorded living upwards of 12 years, while in captivity, it is reported living 19 years.

See also
Bats of Canada
Bats of the United States

References

External links
Keen's Myotis at the Smithsonian National Museum of Natural History

Mouse-eared bats
Bats of Canada
Bats of the United States
Fauna of the Western United States
Taxonomy articles created by Polbot
Mammals described in 1895
Taxa named by Clinton Hart Merriam